Idaspe is an opera by baroque composer Riccardo Broschi. It is notable for starring the composer’s brother, Farinelli, in the role of Dario. The famous arias Qual guerrero in campo armato, and Ombra fedele anch’io are from this opera.

Roles 
 Artaserse, king of Persia, in love with Berenice
 Dario, brother of Artaserse and friend of Idaspe, who disguises himself as Arbato, a general.
 Idaspe, nephew of Artaserse, disguised as Acrone
 Arbace, captain of the guard
 Mandane, daughter of the king of Media, in love with Dario
 Berenice, a Persian princess.

Plot

References 

 https://www.allmusic.com/artist/riccardo-broschi-mn0001205220/biography
https://www.oxfordmusiconline.com/grovemusic/view/10.1093/gmo/9781561592630.001.0001/omo-9781561592630-e-
https://www.histouring.com/en/historical-figure/carlo-broschi/

18th-century operas
Italian-language operas
Operas